The Cyano-S1 RNA motif (originally named the Cyano-30S motif) is a conserved RNA structure present in some species of Cyanobacteria.  Cyano-S1 RNAs are consistently found upstream of genes encoding ribosomal protein S1, a subunit of the ribosome.  Therefore, they are presumed to be ribosomal protein leaders, i.e., cis-regulatory elements to which the ribosomal protein S1 binds, thereby controlling its expression levels.

See also
Cyano-2 RNA motif
Yfr2
Yfr1

References

Ribosomal protein leader